Young Sherlocks is a 1922 American silent short subject comedy film, the fourth entry in Hal Roach's Our Gang series. Directed by Robert F. McGowan and Tom McNamara, the two-reel short was released to theaters in November 1922 by Pathé.

Plot
The film begins with Ernie using his ingenuity to overcome his poverty and find a way to feed his little sister Farina and his steed, Dinah the mule. He encounters Jackie, who is selling newspapers, and learns about a kidnapper who is at large. Ernie then stumbles into a secret meeting of several young boys, including Mickey Daniels and Jack Davis, who call themselves the JJJs (Jesse James Juniors). They tell him that he is unwelcome in their meeting unless he can tell them what good deed he has ever done. He responds by spinning a long, and very unbelievable, tall tale of how he, Jackie, and Dinah rescued Peggy from the kidnappers. At the end of his story he claims that he used his reward money to buy a whole town, name it Free Town, and make himself Mayor and Jackie the Chief of Police. It is a beautiful town where all the children have plenty to eat, have nice clothes, and can have all the cake and candy they want. The story, and the film, ends with reality as Ernie’s mother finds him and hauls him and Farina back home.

Notes
William Gillespie and Dick Gilbert both play dual roles in this film.
When the television rights for the original silent Pathé Our Gang comedies were sold to National Telepix and other distributors, several episodes were retitled. This film was released into television syndication as "Mischief Makers" in 1960 under the title Little Heroes. About two-thirds of the original film was included.
The film was also released as an episode of the television series "Those Lovable Scallawags With Their Gangs" under the title Young Sherlock (no plural). Among the scenes cut from the latter TV print were most of the opening sequence with Sunshine Sammy and Farina; most of the inter-titles were left intact.

Cast

The Gang
 Peggy Cartwright as Mary Jane
 Jackie Condon as Jackie a.k.a. Mickey
 Allen Hoskins as Farina
 Ernie Morrison as Ernie
 Dinah the Mule as herself

Additional Cast
 Mickey Daniels as JJJ Member
 Jack Davis as JJJ Member
 Gabe Saienz as JJJ Member
 Dot Farley as Mary Jane's mother
 Dick Gilbert as A kidnapper / The motorist
 William Gillespie as A kidnapper / The police officer
 Florence Hoskins as Ernie and Farina's mother
 Wallace Howe as A kidnapper
 Mark Jones as A kidnapper
 Joseph Morrison as A bank employee
 George Rowe as The Baker
 Charles Stevenson as Giovanna de Bullochi
 Charley Young as Mary Jane's father

External links

1922 films
Hal Roach Studios short films
Films directed by Robert F. McGowan
American silent short films
American black-and-white films
1922 comedy films
Our Gang films
Articles containing video clips
1922 short films
1920s American films
Silent American comedy films